R.C. Ropp House is a historic home located at Martinsburg, Berkeley County, West Virginia. It was built in 1928 and is a two-story, two bay, frame vernacular house with some Colonial Revival details. It sits on a concrete block foundation and has a standing seam, metal gable roof.  It is built of parts ordered from the Sears and Roebuck Company. Also on the property is a garage (1928).

It was listed on the National Register of Historic Places in 2002.

References

Houses on the National Register of Historic Places in West Virginia
Colonial Revival architecture in West Virginia
Houses completed in 1928
Houses in Berkeley County, West Virginia
Buildings and structures in Martinsburg, West Virginia
National Register of Historic Places in Martinsburg, West Virginia